Epiphthora coniombra is a moth of the family Gelechiidae. It was described by Edward Meyrick in 1904. It is found in Australia, where it has been recorded from New South Wales.

The forewings are white, closely irrorated (sprinkled) with rather dark fuscous. The hindwings are fuscous.

References

Moths described in 1904
Epiphthora
Taxa named by Edward Meyrick